is a dam on the Shō River in Shirakawa, in Gifu Prefecture Japan. It supports a 256 MW hydroelectric power station. Of the nine dams on the Shō River, it is the furthest upstream.

The dam flooded several villages and shrines, submerging them completely, two cherry trees were taken from one of the submerged shrines and placed in Shirakawa-go where it is said that each petal represents a memory from someone who lived in the villages before they were flooded.

Over 200+ houses were to be submerged, including Minka houses, and about 1,200 people were forced to relocate, so the residents of the planned submerged area violently opposed the dam construction plan. In 1961, all structures were submerged and the dam was completed.

References

Dams in Gifu Prefecture
Hydroelectric power stations in Japan
Dams completed in 1961
Dams on the Shō River
Rock-filled dams